The 1950 Atlético Mineiro European tour was an episode in the history of Clube Atlético Mineiro, an association football club based in Belo Horizonte, Brazil, in which it played a series of friendly football matches against clubs in Europe, becoming the first club of Minas Gerais and also the first Brazilian at professional level to compete in that continent. 

Atlético Mineiro played ten matches on European soil from 1 November to 7 December 1950, touring through West Germany (where it took part in a Winter Tournament), Austria, Belgium, Luxembourg and France (including the Saar Protectorate). The Brazilian team won six matches, lost two and tied the remaining, scoring 24 goals and conceding 18.

Having occurred at a time when neither national competitions in Brazil nor continental in South America exist, and in the wake of the traumatic Maracanazo, the tour and Atlético's results, many of which achieved under adverse weather conditions and snow, were seen by national sports media at the time as a historic achievement for Brazilian football.

Background 
In 1950, a commission formed by the German Football Association traveled to Brazil to choose a football club to a series of friendly matches in Germany against some of the country's club sides. The recency of both the Maracanazo, a traumatic event for Brazilian football, and World War II, in which Germany and Brazil were at opposite sides, may have made clubs from Rio de Janeiro and São Paulo, then the footballing centres of the country, refuse participation in the friendly tour. Eventually Atlético Mineiro, then state league champion of Minas Gerais, was selected. Canor Simões, a journalist and sports director of the time, was credited as influential in the choice.

Tour 
Atlético Mineiro's delegation arrived in Frankfurt on 27 October, where it was welcomed by German sports media, as it was the first time a Brazilian club played in the country. From there, the team traveled to Munich, where it played its first match against 1860 München, from Oberliga Süd, on 1 November. The match was played at the Grünwalder Stadion, with 35,000 spectators, under a misty and cool weather, and Atlético won 4–3. Hamburg was the team's second stop, where it defeated Oberliga Nord winner Hamburger SV 4–0 in front of 20,000 people at the Rothenbaum, on 4 November. Only 24 hours later, Atlético Mineiro travelled to Bremen, and suffered the tour's first defeat: 1–3 to Werder (that also played in the Oberliga Nord) at the Weserstadion, with an attendance of 26,000. A one-week rest followed, after which the team traveled to Gelsenkirchen. Schalke 04, which went on to win that season's Oberliga West, was defeated 3–1. The encounter was a farewell match for Schalke legends Ernst Kuzorra and Fritz Szepan, and was attended by 30,000 at the Glückauf-Kampfbahn on 12 November.
From Germany, Atlético followed to Vienna, where 60,000 people saw the Brazilians lose 0–3 to a strong Rapid Wien side, which would form the backbone of the Austria national football team in the 1954 FIFA World Cup, the tour's worst result. Viennese press reported that Atlético Mineiro's players complained about refereeing (a supposed offside goal and a non-existent penalty to Rapid), as well as about the crowd's behaviour, which they saw as menacing (even though the home team's supporters were only raising their arms to applaud the visitors). On 20 November, the team played 1.FC Saarbrücken, then out of the German Football Association and playing in the French football league system because of Saarlands's French protectorate status; Atlético won the match by 2–0.

A trip to Belgium followed, where 40,000 watched the team beat Belgian First Division champions Anderlecht, led by forward Joseph Mermans, by a 2–1 score, on 22 November. On 26 November the club returned to Germany, where it tied with Oberliga Nord's Eintracht Braunschweig 3–3 at Eintracht-Stadion in front of 30,000 people. Another 3–3 tie followed, this time in Luxembourg against Union, increased by players from some other Luxembourger sides, on 5 December. The tour ended in Paris with a match against Stade Français on 7 December at Parc des Princes with a 4,000 attendance. Atlético won 2–1 under an extremely low temperature, which forced goalkeeper Kafunga to put his hands in a hot water bottle during the match, and caused midfielder Barbatana to suffer from hypothermia.

The tour ended in turmoil at European soil, however, as a disagreement between the club's board members and the German tour manager Eden Kaltenecker resulted in the disappearance of the latter and a shortage of money for the return trip to Brazil, which had to be ultimately funded by Minas Gerais State Government. A planned match against French champion Lille, to be played on 10 December, was also cancelled because of intense cold.

Aftermath 
Brazilian press anticipated the return of the club's delegation, which was honored by the Brazilian Sports Confederation and received a standing ovation at the Maracanã before a Campeonato Carioca match. The team was welcomed by over 50,000 people upon its return to Belo Horizonte, in what was described as an "apotheotic" celebration in the city streets. Despite not having an unbeaten run, sports media lauded Atlético Mineiro's tour as a historical success for the country's football, which had suffered a major setback with the Maracanazo in the same year. The results achieved under adverse conditions and snowy grounds led to the dubbing of the team as Campeões do Gelo (Portuguese for "Ice Champions"), a feat remembered in the club's official anthem.

Matches

Club delegation

Players

Staff

See also 
 History of Clube Atlético Mineiro

References

Clube Atlético Mineiro